Commander Shafi Hazara was an ethnic Hazara military commander in Afghanistan. He was a senior commander during the resistance of west Kabul and Hazarajat between 1991 and 1996. In the 1990s he led Hezbe Wahdat Brigade 2 military wing against rival militias and, against the Taliban takeover.

Early life 
Shafi was born in March 1964 in Chindawol, Kabul. Originally from the Turkman Valley, Parwan province. He went to Parsa Elementary School and Ansari High School. After graduating, Shafi went to his home village, the Turkman Valley, and joined Sazman Al-Nasr in Jihad against the Red Army of Russia.

Shafi Dewana (Shafi the Mad)
Shafi was called "Shafi Deewana" (Shafi the Mad) due to his exceptional military tactics that angered a collection of adversaries. He would continuously put himself in danger by standing on top of containers and running towards the opposition, resulting in his enemies calling him "Dewana".

Battles
On May 1, 1992, he returned to Kabul and formed a six-man unit and started his armed struggle against the communist government. In the first battles, he captured the state security office department, the Ministry of Interior, the sixth security district, and Mahtab Qala and Dasht-e Barchi security checkpoints. Soon he would become one of the senior commanders of Hezb Wahdat. Shafi formed Brigade Two infantry unit. It was not long before hundreds of young men joined him. In the first imposed war, they cleared the opposition from many areas of west Kabul. After gaining many resources, which included all kinds of light and heavy weapons. Under Shafi's command, Brigade Two forces managed most of the front and strategic defense lines of west Kabul Kabul. He participated in essential operations as a prominent and leading commander.

Ghazni
When the Taliban emerged in Afghanistan, they entered Ghazni from Qandahar. With three to four hundred of his soldiers, Shafi entered Ghazni to fight the Taliban and confronted them, killing dozens of Taliban members. The Taliban repeatedly confessed to Hezb Wahdat representatives that we had minimal casualties while we had captured several provinces. However, in Ghazni, Shafi had killed dozens of our troops. After a few months of battling, his unit retreated to Kabul.

Post Kabul civil battles
After the fall of the west Kabul resistance and the martyrdom of Abdul Ali Mazari, Shafi went to Peshawar, Pakistan, and from there to Mazar-i-Sharif, where he spent some time buying weapons, regrouping, and gathering his forces. After the funeral of Abdul Ali Mazari, Shafi entered Hazarajat and went into battle with the Taliban and rival factions. He established security throughout the central areas of Afghanistan. He set several checkpoints, and bases some of his most essential headquarters were located in Shekh Ali District, Turkman Valley, Haji Gak Pass, The valley of Six Bridge, Bamiyan & and Iraq Valley.

Assassination 
Shafi was killed on 22 August 1996. His assassination took place in the home of Karim Khalili central Bamiyan. Karim Khalili and his collaborators killed Shafi and shortly after attacked his Six Bridge post killing one additional soldier and wounding many. His assassination is acknowledged as a betrayal by the Hazara people. Many essential details still have remained unclear. He was buried in Bamiyan by the local people but later transferred to his hometown by his soldiers. Shafi's body rests in the Dahn Khakrez cemetery in Turkman Valley.

See also 

 Abdul Ali Mazari
 Mehdi Mujahid
 Afghanistan conflict (1978–present)
 List of Hazara people

References

Hazara military personnel
Hazara people
Afghan Civil War (1992–1996)
1964 births
1996 deaths